Postwick with Witton is a civil parish on the Broads in the English county of Norfolk, comprising the two adjacent villages of Postwick and Witton.

For the purposes of local government, the parish falls within the district of Broadland.
Although the Wherry Lines rail line passes through Postwick, there is no station.  In the west of the parish at the junction of the A47 and A1042 is Postwick Park and Ride, one of six such sites surrounding Norwich. A ferry once operated on the River Yare between Postwick and Surlingham. It ceased  following a collision with a coaster

Toponymy 
The name 'Postwick' means 'Poss(a)'s specialised farm'.

'Witton' means 'Wood farm/settlement'.

In popular culture

Postwick is the name of the home town in the eighth generation Pokémon games, Pokémon Sword and Shield.

References

http://kepn.nottingham.ac.uk/map/place/Norfolk/Postwick
http://kepn.nottingham.ac.uk/map/place/Norfolk/Witton

Further reading

External links

Postwick with Witton page on Broadland website
 for Postwick.
 for Witton.
Information from Genuki Norfolk on Postwick.
Information from Genuki Norfolk on Witton.
All Saints, Postwick
Postwick Park and Ride

Civil parishes in Norfolk
Broadland